
Patiriella regularis, or New Zealand common cushion star, is a sea star of the family Asterinidae, native to New Zealand.

It is one of New Zealand's most common rocky shore starfish. It is abundant in shallow water around both mainland islands. They come in a large range of colours and have 4–6 arms.

They feed on algae, barnacles and invertebrates. To catch their food the cushion star inflates its cushion and then deflates on top of its prey.

They were introduced into waters in south east Tasmania, where they have become well established. Concern exists that they may be an invasive species. They breed in January to March. Once fertilised,  9–10 weeks are needed  for them to grow from larvae.

Research
A genetic variance is found in P. regularis from the North and South of New Zealand. Geographic barriers, and coastal upwellings might keep various types of P. regularis from being able to spread or comingle.

References

Patiriella
Echinoderms of New Zealand
Taxa named by Addison Emery Verrill
Animals described in 1867